Garema Place is a paved outdoor area in Civic, Canberra, Australia, with a number of shops, restaurants and cafes with outdoor dining. As a central point within the CBD, many community events including protests and festivals are held at the location.

Garema Place was designed by Walter Burley Griffin as part of the forecourt of a future Canberra railway station, which would have been located near Bunda Street, but was never built. From 1921 to 1923 a railway line which connected with the station at Kingston terminated near the present day location of Garema Place until the rail bridge over the Molonglo River was washed away in a flood.

Garema Place is the location of Canberra's Multicultural Festival held each February and the Celebrate Canberra Festival in March.

In 1963, then-Prime Minister Robert Menzies opened the Canberra Centre shopping mall along Garema Place, which became the first in Australia to be fully-enclosed and air-conditioned with three floors. Due to the expansive nature of the centre and its association with the Garema Place area, the Centre has since grown to also cover the land, as if it was a district of its own.

Garema Place is known for its sculptures and artworks by local artists, predominantly a silver statue of a pillow located in the main area near the chess board. This pillow is colloquially known as the 'Goon Bag,' due to its resemblance to the item and the item's wide knowledge in Australian culture.

See also

References

External links 
Citysearch – Garema place

Canberra urban places
Streets in Canberra
Busking venues
Squares in Australia